Brachystomia angusta is a species of sea snail, a marine gastropod mollusk in the family Pyramidellidae, the pyrams and their allies.

Distribution
This species occurs in the following locations:
 Canary Islands
 Cape Verde
 Europe
 European waters (ERMS scope)
 Mauritania
 Mediterranean Sea
 Portuguese Exclusive Economic Zone
 Spanish Exclusive Economic Zone
 United Kingdom Exclusive Economic Zone

References

External links
 To Biodiversity Heritage Library (3 publications)
 To CLEMAM
 To Encyclopedia of Life
 To GenBank

Pyramidellidae
Gastropods described in 1867
Molluscs of the Atlantic Ocean
Molluscs of Macaronesia
Molluscs of the Mediterranean Sea